Allen's Landing is an unincorporated community in eastern Bois Brule Township in Perry County, Missouri. Thomas Allen, an Irish immigrant, settled here in 1797. A post office was established in 1862 and operated until 1869.

References

Unincorporated communities in Perry County, Missouri
Unincorporated communities in Missouri